Barepat is a village in the Chambarak Municipality of the Gegharkunik Province of Armenia. The village is a part of the Kalavan community. The village was populated by Azerbaijanis before the exodus of Azerbaijanis from Armenia during the outbreak of the Nagorno-Karabakh conflict. In 1988–1989 Armenian refugees from Azerbaijan settled in the village.

References

External links 
 

Populated places in Gegharkunik Province